David Lovelle Jackson (born March 29, 1976) is an American Olympic boxer.

He competed in the men's Lightweight division at the 2000 Summer Olympics in Sydney.

Jackson was born in Seattle, Washington and attended Garfield High School.

References

1976 births
Living people
American male boxers
Lightweight boxers
Boxers at the 2000 Summer Olympics
Olympic boxers of the United States
Sportspeople from Seattle
Boxers from Washington (state)